This is a list of regions of Uruguay by Human Development Index as of 2023 with data for the year 2021.

References 

Uruguay
 Human Development Index
Uruguay